WSP Danmark A/S, formerly Orbicon, is a Danish technical advisory services company. WSP Danmark is a knowledge-based company which provides professional and sustainable engineering consulting services in the fields of the construction, environment, environmental technology, the working environment, organising, and planning. It had 465 employees and revenues of 416 mio. DKK in 2013.

Orbicon was created in 2006, and is a subsidiary, and 100% owned by the business foundation “Det Danske Hedeselskab” (DDH)". Orbicon is a result of the union of an environmental consultance company and a construction engineering company.
Orbicon operates in Denmark, Greenland, Sweden and Iceland.

Location
WSP Danmark is based in an 8,200 square metre, DGNB Gold-certified building at  Linnés Allé in Taastrup. The building was inaugurated in August 2017. It is owned by PensionDanmark.

Services
The company advise on technology, legislation and economy. It also offer services to help customers to design, plan and implement construction projects, environmental projects and projects aimed at the working environment and organisational and institutional building. 
Orbicon specializes in:
 Environment
 Utilities
 Construction
 Working environment
 Plants
 Climate & Energy
 Operations & Maintenance
 IT solutions
In addition, Orbicon takes on tasks related to environmental technology, as well as programs for monitoring the environment.

References

Engineering consulting firms
Construction and civil engineering companies of Denmark
Service companies based in Copenhagen
Companies based in Høje-Taastrup Municipality
Danish companies established in 2006
Consulting firms established in 2006
Construction and civil engineering companies established in 2006